Mental accounting (or psychological accounting) attempts to describe the process whereby people code, categorize and evaluate economic outcomes. The concept was first named by Richard Thaler. Mental accounting deals with the budgeting and categorization of expenditures. People budget money into mental accounts for expenses (e.g., saving for a home) or expense categories (e.g., gas money, clothing, utilities). Mental accounts are believed to act as a self-control strategy. People are presumed to make mental accounts as a way to manage and keep track of their spending and resources. People also are assumed to make mental accounts to facilitate savings for larger purposes (e.g., a home or college tuition). Like many other cognitive processes, it can prompt biases and systematic departures from rational, value-maximizing behavior, and its implications are quite robust. Understanding the flaws and inefficiencies of mental accounting is essential to making good decisions and reducing human error.

As Thaler puts it, “All organizations, from General Motors down to single person households, have explicit and/or implicit accounting systems. The accounting system often influences decisions in unexpected ways”. We often see consumer behavior deviate from the standard economic prediction; mental accounting is a framework that seeks to further explain consumer behavior, and describe when consumers might violate standard economic principles. Particularly, individual expenses will usually not be considered in conjunction with the present value of one’s total wealth; they will be instead considered in the context of two accounts: the current budgetary period (this could be a monthly process due to bills, or yearly due to an annual income), and the category of expense. People can even have multiple mental accounts for the same kind of resource. A person may use different monthly budgets for grocery shopping and eating out at restaurants, for example, and constrain one kind of purchase when its budget has run out while not constraining the other kind of purchase, even though both expenditures draw on the same fungible resource (income).

One detailed application of mental accounting, the behavioral life cycle hypothesis , posits that people mentally frame assets as belonging to either current income, current wealth or future income and this has implications for their behavior as the accounts are largely non-fungible and marginal propensity to consume out of each account is different.

Utility, value and transaction 

In mental accounting theory, framing means that the way a person subjectively frames a transaction in their mind will determine the utility they receive or expect. This concept is similarly used in prospect theory, and many mental accounting theorists adopt that theory as the value function in their analysis. It is important to note that the value function is concave for gains (implying an aversion to risk) and convex for losses (implying a risk-seeking attitude). This can influence the way people evaluate transactions.

Given this framework, how do people interpret, or ‘account for’, multiple transactions/outcomes, of the format ? They can either view the outcomes jointly, and receive , in which case the outcomes are integrated, or, in which case we say that the outcomes are segregated.

Here, we see that . Thus, we want to segregate multiple gains.

Here, we see that . We want to integrate multiple losses.

In this case, . Utility is maximized when we integrate a mixed gain.

In this case, . Clearly, we don't want to integrate a mixed loss when the less is significantly larger than the gain. This is often referred to as a "silver lining", a reference to the folk maxim "every cloud has a silver lining". When the loss is just barely larger than the gain, integration may be preferred. 

Clearly, the way in which we perceive two outcomes (how we account for them), can influence how positively (or negatively) we view them.

Another very important concept used to understand mental accounting is that of modified utility function. There are two values attached to any transaction - acquisition value and transaction value. Acquisition value is the money that one is ready to part with for physically acquiring some good. Transaction value is the value one attaches to having a good deal. If the price that one is paying is equal to the mental reference price for the good, the transaction value is zero. If the price is lower than the reference price, the transaction utility is positive. Total utility received from a transaction, then, is the sum of acquisition utility and transaction utility.

Pain of Paying 

A more proximal psychological mechanism through which mental accounting influences spending is through its influence on the pain of paying that is associated with spending money from a mental account. Pain of paying is a negative affective response associated with a financial loss. Prototypical examples are the unpleasant feeling that one experiences when watching the fare increase on a taximeter or at the gas pump. When considering an expense, consumers appear to compare the cost of the expense to the size of an account that it would deplete (e.g., numerator vs. denominator). A $30 t-shirt, for example, would be a subjectively larger expense when drawn from $50 in one's wallet than $500 in one's checking account. The larger the fraction, the more pain of paying the purchase appears to generate and the less likely consumers are to then exchange money for the good. Other evidence of the relation between pain of paying and spending include the lower debt held by consumers who report experiencing a higher pain of paying for the same goods and services than consumers who report experiencing less pain of paying.

Practical implications

Psychology 
Mental accounting is subject to many logical fallacies and cognitive biases, which hold many implications such as overspending.

Credit cards and cash payments 
Another example of mental accounting is the greater willingness to pay for goods when using credit cards than cash. If one uses a credit card to pay for tickets to a sporting event, they will tend to be willing to pay more than if they made their bid with cash. This phenomenon is also related to transaction decoupling, the separation of when a good is acquired and when it is actually paid for. Swiping a credit card prolongs the payment to a later date (when we pay our monthly bill) and it adds it to a large existing sum (our bill to that point). This delay causes the payment to stick in our memory less clearly and saliently. Furthermore, the payment is no longer perceived in isolation; rather, it is seen as a (relatively) small increase of an already large credit card bill. For example, it might be a change from $120 to $125, instead of a regular, out-of-pocket $5 cost. And as we can see from our value function, this V(-$125) – V(-$120) is smaller than V(-$5). This phenomenon is referred to as payment decoupling.

Marketing 
Mental accounting is useful for marketers, in particular, as it makes useful predictions for how consumers will respond to different ways of presenting losses and gains. People respond more positively to incentives and costs when gains are segregated, losses are integrated, marketers segregate net losses (the silver lining principle), and integrate net gains.  Automotive dealers, for example, benefit from these principles when they bundle optional features into a single price but segregate each feature included in the bundle (e.g., heated seats, heated steering wheel, mirror defrosters). Cellular phone companies can use principles of mental accounting when deciding how much to charge consumers for a new smartphone and to give them for their trade-in. When the cost of the phone is large and the value of the phone to be traded in is low, it is better to charge consumers a slightly higher price for the phone and return that money to them as a higher value on their trade in. Conversely, when the cost of the phone and the value of the trade-in are more comparable, because consumers are loss averse, it is better to charge them less for the new phone and offer them less for the trade-in.

Public policy 
Mental accounting can also be utilized in public economics and public policy. Policy-makers and public economists would do well to consider mental accounting when crafting public systems, trying to understand and identify market failures, redistribute wealth or resources in a fair way, reduce the saliency of sunk costs, limiting or eliminating the Free-rider problem, or even just when delivering bundles of multiple goods or services to taxpayers. Inherently, the way that people (and therefore taxpayer and voters) perceive decisions and outcomes will be influenced by their process of mental accounting. If policy-makers consider the implications of how people mentally book-keep their decisions, they should be able to frame and construct public policy that results in better decisions for health, wealth, and happiness.

A good example of the importance of considering mental accounting while crafting public policy is demonstrated by authors Justine Hastings and Jesse Shapiro in their analysis of the SNAP (Supplemental Nutritional Assistance Program). They "argue that these findings are not consistent with households treating SNAP funds as fungible with non-SNAP funds, and we support this claim with formal tests of fungibility that allow different households to have different consumption functions" Put differently, their data supports Thaler's (and the concept of mental accounting's) claim that the principle of fungibility is often violated in practice. Furthermore, they find SNAP to be very effective, calculating a marginal propensity to consume SNAP-eligible food (MPCF) out of benefits received by SNAP of 0.5 to 0.6. This is much higher than the MPCF out of cash transfers, which is usually around 0.1. Clearly, mental accounting is leveraged by SNAP to make it a more effective policy.

Authors Emmanuel Farhi and Xavier Gabaix examine the implications of mental accounting for taxation in their paper: Optimal Taxation with Behavioral Insights. The authors main goal is to revisit the three pillars of optimal taxation, and add a behavioral twist to them which tries to incorporate mental accounting (as well as misperceptions and internalities). They reach a number of novel economic insights, showing how to incorporate nudges in the optimal taxation frameworks, and challenging the Diamond-Mirrlees productive efficiency result and the Atkinson-Stiglitz uniform commodity taxation proposition, finding they are more likely to fail with behavioral agents.

In the paper Public vs. Private Mental Accounts: Experimental Evidence from Savings Groups in Colombia, Luz Magdalena Salas shows how mental accounting can be exploited to help nudge people towards saving more. In the randomized control trial that she runs, we see that labeling savings goals in different ways can lead to different levels of success in achieving savings goals. Further, the power of this labeling effect differs based on the saving success that people were having to begin with.

Mental accounting plays a powerful role in our decision-making processes. It is important for public policy experts, researchers, and policy-makers continue to explore the ways that it can be utilized to benefit public welfare.

See also 
 Decision making
 Behavioral economics
 Framing effect (psychology)
 Micropayment
 Preference
 Psychological pricing
 Transaction cost
 Sunk cost

References

Bibliography

Behavioral finance